Suriname competed at the 2020 Summer Olympics in Tokyo. Originally scheduled to take place from 24 July to 9 August 2020, the Games have been postponed to 23 July to 8 August 2021, because of the COVID-19 pandemic. It was the nation's fourteenth appearance at the Summer Olympics.

Competitors

Badminton

Suriname qualified one badminton player into the Olympic tournament. Rio 2016 Olympian Sören Opti accepted the invitation from the Tripartite Commission and the Badminton World Federation to compete in the men's singles. After he tested positive for COVID-19, Opti officially pulled out from the Games.

Cycling

Track
Following the completion of the 2020 UCI Track Cycling World Championships, Suriname entered one rider to compete in the men's sprint and keirin at the Games, based on his final individual UCI Olympic rankings. Additionally, this marked the country's return to the sport for the first time since Barcelona 1992.

Sprint

Keirin

Swimming

Suriname received a universality invitation from FINA to send a top-ranked male swimmer in his respective individual events to the Olympics, based on the FINA Points System of June 28, 2021.

See also
Suriname at the 2019 Pan American Games

References

Nations at the 2020 Summer Olympics
2020
2021 in Suriname